The 2019 Grand Prix of Portland was the 16th And penultimate round of the 2019 IndyCar Series season. The race was held on September 1 at Portland International Raceway, in Portland, Oregon. Colton Herta started on pole but, the race was won by Will Power with Felix Rosenqvist finishing second and Alexander Rossi third.

Results

Race 

All cars utilized Dallara chassis with the Universal Aero Kit 18, and Firestone Firehawk tires

Graham Rahal was given a time penalty to where instead of finishing behind car numbers 7, 5, and 26 whom were terminally disabled behind him, he finished behind those cars instead.

References 

Grand Prix of Portland
2019
Grand Prix of Portland